The 2021–22 season was the 102nd season in the existence of Empoli F.C. and the club's first season back in the top flight of Italian football. In addition to the domestic league, Empoli participated in this season's edition of the Coppa Italia.

Players

First-team squad

Out on loan

Transfers

In

Out

Pre-season and friendlies

Competitions

Overview

Serie A

League table

Results summary

Results by round

Matches
The league fixtures were announced on 14 July 2021.

Coppa Italia

Statistics

Appearances and goals

|-
! colspan=14 style=background:#dcdcdc; text-align:center"| Goalkeepers

|-
! colspan=14 style=background:#dcdcdc; text-align:center"| Defenders

|-
! colspan=14 style=background:#dcdcdc; text-align:center"| Midfielders

|-
! colspan=14 style=background:#dcdcdc; text-align:center"| Forwards

|-
! colspan=14 style=background:#dcdcdc; text-align:center"| Players transferred out during the season

References

Empoli F.C. seasons
Empoli